The 1977 USA Outdoor Track and Field Championships took place between June 9–10 at Drake Stadium on the campus of University of California, Los Angeles in Westwood, California. The decathlon took place on July 9–10 in Bloomington, Indiana.  This meet was organized by the AAU.

Results

Men track events

Men field events

Women track events

Women field events

See also
United States Olympic Trials (track and field)

References

 Results from T&FN
 results

USA Outdoor Track and Field Championships
Usa Outdoor Track And Field Championships, 1977
Track and field
Track and field in California
Outdoor Track and Field Championships
Outdoor Track and Field Championships
Sports competitions in California